The 2002–03 season was the 92nd season in Hajduk Split’s history and their 12th in the Prva HNL. Their second place finish in the 2001–02 season meant it was their 12th successive season playing in the Prva HNL.

First-team squad 
Squad at end of season

Left club during season

Competitions

Overall record

Prva HNL

First stage

Second stage (championship play-off)

Results summary

Results by round

Results by opponent

Source: 2002–03 Croatian First Football League article

Matches

Prva HNL

Source: hajduk.hr

Croatian Football Cup

Source: hajduk.hr

UEFA Cup

Source: hajduk.hr

Player seasonal records

Top scorers

Source: Competitive matches

See also
2002–03 Croatian First Football League
2002–03 Croatian Football Cup

References

External sources
 2002–03 Prva HNL at HRnogomet.com
 2002–03 Croatian Cup at HRnogomet.com
 2002–03 UEFA Cup at rsssf.com

HNK Hajduk Split seasons
Hajduk Split